Geraldine Brown Parrish (1936–2004) was an American criminal and murderer. Between May 1985 and 1988, she hired two men, Edwin Gordon and Lionel Robinson, for a series of brutal insurance murders in Baltimore, Maryland. Parrish suffered from a superiority complex, as a result of which her relatives and close friends became victims of her crimes.

Biography 
Very little is known about Parrish's early life. She was born in rural North Carolina, in a poor family with several other brothers and sisters. In her youth, Parrish began attending church, where she became acquainted with the basics of Catholicism. Later on, she developed an interest in the religions practiced by people in Central and West Africa, particularly Santería and Voodoo. In subsequent years, she studied deeper into the religious aspects and rituals, and eventually came to practice them. Since the 1970s, she began to present herself as a member of the clergy, but no supporting evidence of her position in any religion was uncovered, and her position as an ordained minister was declared a breakaway.

Murders 
In the late 1970s, Parrish began to show signs of a superiority complex and began to exhibit deviant behavior towards her friends and relatives. In the early 1980s, she developed a get rich quick scheme by receiving insurance benefits via life insurance policies. For this purpose, Parrish urged relatives, friends and acquaintances to make life insurance policies that made her the only beneficiary in the event of an untimely death. In order to get said benefits, Parrish planned out several killings in the mid-1980s. 

The first victim was 46-year-old Frank Lee Ross, an ex-husband of one of Parrish's sisters, who was shot dead on November 12, 1985. This murder was committed by 20-year-old Edwin Bernardo Gordon, whom Parrish paid more than $2,000 to commit the killing. On October 6, 1986, Albert Robinson and Parrish's brother Ronald Brown were killed by Lionel Robinson (no relation), and on March 6, 1987, 65-year-old Helen Wright, Parrish's housekeeper, was killed. After her death, Parrish received more than $10,000 from life insurance and social security checks. This murder was also committed by Gordon, who also received a reward of $2,000. 

Six months later, Parrish arranged a plan to kill her niece, 29-year-old Dolly Brown, for whom Parrish was the beneficiary of an insurance policy worth more than $10,000. On September 19, 1987, Edwin attacked Brown and her husband, 37-year-old Ronald Mitcher, during which Mitcher was shot dead. Brown survived, and went on to survive two more attempts on her life.

Arrest 
After the unsuccessful attempt to kill Dolly Brown in May 1988, Edwin Gordon was arrested and soon began cooperating with investigators. He told them that Parrish had orchestrated everything, and she was arrested later that summer. Gordon was charged with three murders, four counts of assault and conspiracy to murder, while Geraldine was charged with conspiracy to murder and contract killing. Subsequently, Parrish was suspected of committing several more murders, after it became clear that 77-year-old Rayfield Gilliard died in February 1988, 15 days after marrying her. He had left his home, money and social benefits amounting to $440 per month in a life insurance policy, which Geraldine began receiving a month after his death. The death certificate stated that Gilliard had died from a cardiovascular disease, but there was no record in his medical history that he ever had any heart problems.

Trial and Imprisonment
Parrish's trial began in early 1989. In May, she and Edwin Gordon pleaded guilty to organizing and committing four murders between November 1985 to May 1988, in order to receive insurance benefits in the amount of $39,000. They were also found guilty of assaulting three more people. After the conviction, Parrish received eight terms of life imprisonment, with no chance of parole. Her accomplice was also given several life imprisonment terms.

After her conviction, Parrish was sent to the Maryland Correctional Institution for Women to serve her sentence. Parrish died in custody of natural causes in 2004.

References 

1936 births
2004 deaths
20th-century American criminals
American female serial killers
American people convicted of attempted murder
American people convicted of murder
Criminals from Maryland
Criminals from North Carolina
Fratricides
Murderers for life insurance money
People convicted of murder by Maryland
People from North Carolina
Prisoners sentenced to life imprisonment by Maryland
Serial killers who died in prison custody